Church of St. Nerses the Great, is an Armenian Apostolic church in Nagorno-Karabakh, in the town of Martuni. The church was consecrated in 2004. It is dedicated to the famous Armenian Catholicos, St. Nerses the Great.

Gallery

References 

Armenian Apostolic churches
Churches in the Republic of Artsakh
Diocese of Artsakh